Gene Manternach (born December 3, 1953) is an American politician in the state of Iowa.

Manternach was born in Monticello, Iowa. He attended Iowa State University and Northeast Iowa Community College and is a farmer. A Republican, he served in the Iowa House of Representatives from 2001 to 2005 (31st district from 2003 to 2005 and 56th district from 2001 to 2003).

References

1953 births
Living people
People from Monticello, Iowa
Iowa State University alumni
Farmers from Iowa
Republican Party members of the Iowa House of Representatives